Brian McCardie is a Scottish actor and writer.

Early life
Brian McCardie attended St. Brendan’s, then St. Athanasius Primary Schools. He went on to Our Lady's High School in Motherwell.  His parents moved from Motherwell to Carluke while he was at school and he developed an interest in theatre, starring in a production of the musical "Godspell" with a local drama group consisting of youngsters from local schools.

Career
McCardie recently appeared in the BBC One three-part drama Time, as Jackson Jones, written by Jimmy McGovern, directed by Lewis Arnold and starring Stephen Graham and Sean Bean. He also appeared in Sky Atlantic’s Domina, set in Ancient Rome, playing Cicero. He performed his self-penned one-man play Connolly at the Lyric Theatre, Belfast but the cancellation of 2020’s Edinburgh Festival meant he lost the opportunity to present it in a six-week run in Edinburgh's Cowgate, where James Connolly was born and raised. 

He has performed readings of his own poems at various venues around Ireland and is currently filming them for distribution online.

Selected filmography

Forget About Me (1990, TV Movie) – Bunny
Waterfront Beat (1990–1991, TV Series) – PC Ronnie Barker
Tonight at 8.30 (1991, TV Series) – Bill – 1st Soldier
Murder Most Horrid (1991, TV Series) – Supermarket Assistant
Doctor Finlay (1993, TV Series) – Archie Henderson
Taggart (1994–2010, TV Series) – Thomas Keenan / Fisher / Martin McLean / Alex Currie
Dirty Old Town (1995, TV Movie) – Vic Leigh
Rob Roy (1995) – Alasdair McGregor
Kidnapped (1995, TV Movie) – David Balfour
The Ghost and the Darkness (1996) – Angus Starling
Speed 2: Cruise Control (1997) – Merced
200 Cigarettes (1999) – Eric
Kavanagh QC (1999, TV Series) – Philip Boxer
Rituals and Resolutions (1999, Short) – Will
Snatch (2000) – Uncle Dean
Beyond the City Limits (2001) – Sergei Akotia
Mr. Barrington (2003) – Mr Barrington
Solid Air (2003) – Robert Houston Junior
The Bill (2004, TV Series) – Taffy Saunders
Ellie Parker (2005) – Acting Student
Murphy's Law (2006, TV Series) – Billy Johnstone
Low Winter Sun (2006, TV Movie) – Det Con Joe Geddes
Lilies (2007, TV Mini-Series) – Dadda Moss
The Whistleblowers (2007, TV Series) – Tim Robey
Rebus (2007, TV Series) – Brian Robertson
Shameless (2008, TV Series) – Paddy McGrath
Kiss of Death (2008, TV Movie) – Michael Bovery
Heroes and Villains (2008, TV Series documentary) – Hernán Cortés
The Damned United (2009) – Dave Mackay
Wasted (2009) – Party Host
Seaside Stories (2009) – Dr. Forbes
Soulboy (2010) – Fish-shop Bobby
Anywhere But Here (2010, TV Movie) – Peter McBride
Thorne: Sleepyhead (2010, TV Mini-Series) – Frank Calvert
Accused (2010, TV Series) – DI Warren
The Witcher 2 (2011, Video Game) – (English version, voice)
The Ripper (2011, Computer Game) – The Reverend (voice)
Case Histories (2011, TV Series) – Terence Smith
Titanic (2012, TV Mini-Series) – First Officer Murdoch
Vexed (2012, TV Series) – Robert Randell
Doors Open (2012, TV Movie) – Charlie Calloway
Line of Duty (2012–2014, TV Series) – Tommy / John Thomas Hunter
The Crash (2013, TV Series) – Charlie Harris
MI High (2013, TV Series) – Mr. McNab
For Those in Peril (2013) – Dr. Forbes
The Groundsman (2013, Short) – Steve
Filth (2013) – Dougie Gillman
Ghosts (2014) – Jacob Engstrand
Peterman (2014) – Bill
Wasted Time (2014) – Danny
The Musketeers (2015, TV Series) – Sebastian Lemaitre
Dropping Off Michael (2015, Short) – Duncan
Holby City (2015, TV Series) – Archie Pugh
Outlander (2015, TV Series) – Sir Marcus MacRannoch
Scarlet (2016, Short) – Fisherman
Rebellion (2016, TV Mini-Series) – James Connolly
The Job (2016) – Geoff
Fortitude 2 (2017, TV Series) – Lazlo Hindemith
Come Out of the Woods (2017, Short) – PC Brian Cassidy
Walk Like a Panther (2018) – Ziggy Barrow
Ordeal by Innocence (2018, TV Mini-Series) – Bellamy Gould (Transmission BBC 1 Easter 2018)
Agatha and The Truth of Murder (2018, DPS Productions, TV Movie) – Sir Hugh Persimmion
Moscow Noir (2018, 8 Part TV Series) – Lord Pendergast 
Giri/Haji (2019, 8 Part Series) – Jack Sister Pictures
Last of The Czars (2019, Netflix/Nutopia, 6 Part Series, TV Series documentary) – Prime Minister Pyotr Stolypin
Our Ladies (2019, Sigma/In a Big Country Films)
Charles lst (2019,  DPS Productions) – Sir John Pym
Domina – Cicero (2020, SkyAtlantic/FiftyFathoms)
Time (TV) – Jackson Jones (2021, BBC)
  Mia and The Dragon Princess (Film) Skipper Matthews (2022) Dead Pixel Productions
 The Long Shadow (TV) (20222023) Steve ITV 
 Six Four (TV) Bill Martin (20222023) ITV

References

External links

1965 births
Date of birth missing (living people)
Male actors from Glasgow
Living people
Scottish male film actors
Scottish male stage actors
Scottish male television actors
National Youth Theatre members